Robert "Bob" DeMarco (born September 16, 1938) is a former American football center who played fifteen seasons in the National Football League for four teams.

Raised in Wood-Ridge, New Jersey, DeMarco graduated in 1956 from St. Mary High School in nearby Rutherford, where he played both offense and defense on the school's football team. He transferred to the University of Dayton from Indiana University, graduating in 1961 with degrees in business management and economics. After three years playing football with the Indiana Hoosiers and Dayton Flyers, and with one year of collegiate eligibility remaining, he was picked by the Chicago Cardinals in the 14th round of 1960 NFL Draft, the 157th overall selection. DeMarco played in the NFL from 1961 to 1969 for the St. Louis Cardinals, from 1970 to 1971 for the Miami Dolphins, from 1972 to 1974 for the Cleveland Browns  and in 1975 for the Los Angeles Rams

DeMarco was named to three Pro Bowls (1963, 1965, 1967) and one first-team All-Pro team (1967) while playing for the Cardinals. In 1967, DeMarco was awarded a game ball after playing with a broken wrist and torn rib cartilage. The Cardinals released DeMarco after the 1969 season and he soon signed a contract with the Miami Dolphins.

DeMarco started every game at center for the Dolphins 1971 that went to the Super Bowl but lost his starting job to Jim Langer during the 1972 preseason.  He was traded the Buffalo Bills but refused to report and retired.  After missing the first two games of the 1972 season he agreed to be traded to the Browns in exchange for a draft pick.

He was inducted into the St. Louis Sports Hall of Fame in 2018.

References

1938 births
Living people
American football offensive linemen
St. Louis Cardinals (football) players
Cleveland Browns players
Miami Dolphins players
Los Angeles Rams players
Eastern Conference Pro Bowl players
Dayton Flyers football players
People from Wood-Ridge, New Jersey
Sportspeople from Bergen County, New Jersey
Players of American football from Jersey City, New Jersey